The FA Sunday Cup is a knock-out competition founded in 1964 for English Sunday league football teams.

Prior to 1960 The Football Association did not permit clubs or players under its jurisdiction to take part in competitive football played on Sunday.  A change of policy by the governing body in 1960 allowed Sunday leagues to become affiliated to County Associations and, four years later, The FA started the Sunday Cup to allow Sunday players to compete in a national knock-out tournament.

The Sunday Cup trophy was presented to the FA by the Shah of Iran as a gift to mark the centenary of the FA in 1963. It was created by Iranian silversmiths.

In the Cup's first season (1964–65), teams representing Sunday players in various counties entered with London winning the two-legged final 6–2 against Staffordshire.

In the first final featuring club sides, Ubique United beat Aldridge Fabrications 1–0 in 1965–66.
 
After The Sunday Cup’s inaugural season, 1,600 requests for entry forms for the following season’s competition were received. Entries for season 2017–18 were 80. Since its inception in 1964-65 (53 years ago) the competition has been won by 42 different sides.

The most successful team is Hetton Lyons Cricket Club FC with 4 wins, in 2006, 2008, 2010, and 2012. St Joseph's (Luton) have appeared in a record five finals, winning on two occasions in 1995 and '96. Eight other teams have been successful on two occasions – Carlton United in 1967 and '73, Newtown Unity in 1972 and '74, Fantail in 1980 and '81, Nicosia in 1991 and 2004, Oyster Martyrs in 2011 and '13, Humbledon Plains Farm in 1990 and 2014, Hardwick Social in 2017 and 2018, and Campfield FC in 2015 and 2020.

Hardwick Social FC became the first club for 22 years to retain the trophy since St Joseph's (Luton) in 1995-96.

The latest holders are Baiteze Squad from the Essex Sunday Corinthian Football League who were crowned as the 2021-22 FA Sunday Cup winners at Millwall's New Den as the defeated Highgate Albion in a 2-0 success. Shomari Barnwell opened the scoring in the early stages of the game before substitute Chaka Barnett headed in late on to confirm victory for the London based side.

Finals 1961-1964

The results of the first finals before the Cup was sanctioned by the FA.

Finals since 1965 (FA sanctioned)

The results of the finals to date:

References

External links
FA Sunday Cup page on the official FA website

Football cup competitions in England